is a Japanese voice actress from Saitama Prefecture.

Biography

Filmography

Anime television
Hell Girl: Three Vessels (2008–2009), Tsubaki
Durarara!! (2010), Shiri
Princess Jellyfish (2010), Gocchan
Maji de Watashi ni Koi Shinasai! (2011), Saki Mimori
Bloody Bunny (2012), Bloody Bunny
Fairy Tail (2012), Mary Hughes
Girls und Panzer (2012), Midoriko Sono, Moyoko Gotō, Nozomi Konparu
Inu X Boku Secret Service (2012), Murai
La storia della Arcana Famiglia (2012), Donatella, Fukurota
Nakaimo - My Sister Is Among Them! (2012), Shogo Mikadono (young)
Sword Art Online (2012), Argo, Pina
Tsuritama (2012), Emi Itō, Yumi Itō
Day Break Illusion (2013), Schrödinger
Karneval (2013), Rissun
Log Horizon (2013–2014), Kawara
Silver Spoon (2013), Mayumi Yoshino
Sword Art Online: Extra Edition (2013), Pina
WataMote (2013), Alice
Hero Bank (2014), Mashiro Kyōshī
Hi-sCoool! SeHa Girls (2014), Mega Drive
Hozuki's Coolheadedness (2014), Yashajirō
Locodol (2014), Shōko Noda
Monster Retsuden Oreca Battle (2014), Poochy Dragon, Red Dragon, Scarlet Dragon
Noragami (2014), Moyu
Sabagebu! (2014), Student Council Vice President
Samurai Flamenco (2014), Hekiru's Niece
Sword Art Online II (2014), Pina
Witch Craft Works (2014), Tanpopo Kuraishi
Log Horizon 2 (2014–2015), Kawara
Shirobako (2014–2015), Ai Kunogi
Durarara!!×2 Shō (2015), Kiyomin
Gangsta. (2015), Sig
Go! Princess PreCure (2015), Stop
Senki Zesshō Symphogear GX (2015), Micha Jawkan (eps. 1 - 8)
Tantei Kageki Milky Holmes TD (2015), Decrescendo
The Asterisk War (2015), Saya Sasamiya
Tribe Cool Crew (2015), Moe
Durarara!!×2 Ketsu (2016), Kiyomin
The Asterisk War Season 2 (2016), Saya Sasamiya
Undefeated Bahamut Chronicle (2016), Tillfur Lilmit
Taboo Tattoo (2016), Iltutmish
Digimon Universe: Appli Monsters (2016), Mienumon
Scorching Ping Pong Girls (2016), Kururi Futamaru
Scum's Wish (2017), Noriko Kamomebata
Seiren (2017), Miu Hiyama
Mahojin Guru Guru 3rd (2017), Kebesubesu (ep. 6, 15)
Made in Abyss (2017), Nanachi
Citrus (2018), Matsuri Mizusawa
The Seven Heavenly Virtues (2018), Sandalphon
Planet With (2018), Ginko Kuroi
Mr. Tonegawa: Middle Management Blues (2018), Zawa Voice (007)
GeGeGe no Kitarō 6th series (2018), Carmilla
Uchi no Maid ga Uzasugiru! (2018), Yui Morikawa
A Certain Magical Index III (2018), Gokusai Kaibi (Girl in The Dress)
Fruits Basket (2019), Delinquent Trio
How Clumsy you are, Miss Ueno (2019), Tamon
Girly Air Force (2019), Phantom 
Demon Slayer: Kimetsu no Yaiba (2019), Kanata Ubuyashiki
Welcome to Demon School! Iruma-kun (2019), Dosanko
Yubisaki kara no Honki no Netsujō: Osananajimi wa Shōbōshi (2019), Ayako Shinoda
If It's for My Daughter, I'd Even Defeat a Demon Lord (2019), Vint
XL Jо̄shi (2019), Saki Watase
Cautious Hero: The Hero Is Overpowered but Overly Cautious (2019), Adenela
Keep Your Hands Off Eizouken! (2020), Robot Club Seki
Infinite Dendrogram (2020), Cheshire
Nekopara (2020), Azuki
A Certain Scientific Railgun T (2020), Gokusai Kaibi (Girl in The Dress)
Interspecies Reviewers (2020), Piltia
The House Spirit Tatami-chan (2020), Tatami-chan
Log Horizon: Destruction of the Round Table (2021), Huadiao
Dragon Goes House-Hunting (2021), Pip
Full Dive (2021), Mizarisa
Blue Reflection Ray (2021), Shino Mizusaki
Edens Zero (2021), E.M. Pino
Don't Toy with Me, Miss Nagatoro (2021), Sakura
Rumble Garanndoll (2021), Misa Kuroki
The Strongest Sage With the Weakest Crest (2022), Iris
Hairpin Double (2022), Green/Ellie Yokosuka
Shadowverse Flame (2022), Dragnir
Made in Abyss: The Golden City of the Scorching Sun (2022), Nanachi
Harem in the Labyrinth of Another World (2022), Sherry
Peter Grill and the Philosopher's Time: Super Extra (2022), Mithlim Nezarant
Chainsaw Man (2022), Pochita
Love Flops (2022), Raburin
Don't Toy with Me, Miss Nagatoro 2nd Attack (2023), Sakura
Handyman Saitō in Another World (2023), Primas
Helck (2023), Piwi
Highspeed Etoile (2024), Towa Komachi

Video games
Caladrius (2013), Maria Therese Bloomfield
Code of Joker (2013), Saya Kyōgokuin
Ginga Force (2013), Tini Memoril
Caladrius Blaze (2014), Maria Therese Bloomfield
Grimoire: Watashi-tachi Grimoire Mahō Gakuen (2014), Rina Yonamine
Tokyo 7th Sisters (2014), Momoka Serizawa
Idol Incidents (2015), Monika Chibana
Senran Kagura Estival Versus (2015), Kafuru
Superdimension Neptune VS Sega Hard Girls (2015), Mega Drive
Icchibanketsu Online (2016), Princess Iwanaga
A.W.: Phoenix Festa (2016), Saya Sasamiya
Traumaster Infinity (2016), Rin Ikenobo
Trickster: Shōkansamurai  ni Naritai (2016), Nanna
X-world (2016), Minerva
Onmyōji (2017), Yōtō-hime
Fate/Grand Order (2017), Assassin of the Nightless City/Wu Zetian
Miitopia (2017), Great Sage
Honkai Impact 3 (2017), Higokumaru
Caravan Stories (2017), Myarol
Alice Gear Aegis (2018), Rin Himukai
Ragnarok M: Eternal Guardians of Love (2018), Ariel
Girls und Panzer: Dream Tank Match (2018), Moyoko Gotō, Nozomi Konparu, Midoriko Sono
Azur Lane (2020), SN Tashkent
Marco & The Galaxy Dragon (2020), Marco
Magia Record: Puella Magi Madoka Magica Side Story (2020), Lapine
Ash Arms (2020), M10 Tank Destroyer
Genshin Impact (2020), Diona
Loopers (2021), Leona
Senjin Aleste (2021), Tanya Taezakura
Soul Hackers 2 (2022), Ash
Trinity Trigger (2022), Rye
Blue Archive (2022), Moe Kazekura
Two Jong Cell!! (2022), Zekko Minegami
Girls' Frontline (2023), Sterling

Films
 Girls und Panzer der Film (2015), Midoriko Sono, Moyoko Gotō, Nozomi Konparu
Pop In Q (2016), Aoi Hioka
 Girls und Panzer das Finale: Part 1 (2017), Midoriko Sono, Moyoko Gotō, Nozomi Konparu
 Girls und Panzer das Finale: Part 2 (2019), Midoriko Sono, Moyoko Gotō, Nozomi Konparu
 Girls und Panzer das Finale: Part 3 (2021), Midoriko Sono, Moyoko Gotō, Nozomi Konparu
 Sword Art Online Progressive: Scherzo of Deep Night (2022), Argo

Dubbing

Live-action
The Monkey King 3, Qiushui (Xinlin He)
Ocean's 8, Veronica (Nathanya Alexander)

Animation
PAW Patrol - Skye (Nickelodeon)
PAW Patrol: The Movie - Skye
 - Shinbi  (Tooniverse)

References

External links 
 Official agency profile 
 
 

1987 births
Living people
Japanese video game actresses
Japanese voice actresses
Voice actresses from Saitama Prefecture